Oh My God! is a 2012 Indian Hindi language satirical comedy-drama film written and directed by Umesh Shukla and produced by Viacom 18 Motion Pictures, S Spice Studios, Grazing Goat Pictures and Playtime Creations. The storyline is based on the Gujarati stage-play Kanji Virudh Kanji which itself was inspired from the Australian film The Man Who Sued God. Producers of this movie purchased remake rights from Australian Producers. The film is originally written by co-writer Saumya Joshi, with Bhavesh Mandalia as an additional co-writer. The film stars Mithun Chakraborty, Akshay Kumar and Paresh Rawal, along with Om Puri, Govind Namdeo, Poonam Jhawer, Puja Gupta and Mahesh Manjrekar in pivotal roles.

The film was remade in Telugu as Gopala Gopala in 2015 with Venkatesh, Pawan Kalyan and Shriya Saran. It was also remade in Kannada as Mukunda Murari in 2016 with Upendra and Sudeep. A second instalment is in development with Akshay Kumar, Pankaj Tripathi, and Yami Gautam.

Plot
Kanji Lalji Mehta, a middle-class Gujarati atheist, owns a shop of Hindu idols and antiques in Mumbai. He makes fun of religious activities around him and one such day, a low-intensity earthquake hits the city, and Kanji's shop is the only shop that is destroyed. His family and friends blame this on his atheism.

At the insurance office, Kanji learns that the disaster claim does not cover any damage caused by natural calamities classified under "Act of God". Running out of options, he decides to sue God but fails to find a lawyer for such a lawsuit. Hanif Qureshi, a lower classed Islam lawyer, helps him file the case after Kanji decides to fight on his own. Legal notices are sent to the insurance company as well as to religious people like Siddheshwar Maharaj, Gopi Maiyya, and their group's founder, Leeladhar Swamy, forcing them to court as representatives of God.

As the court case commences and gains traction for its bizarre quality, Kanji finds himself facing armed fundamentalists and harassment, with his mortgage bank occupying the house, and his wife and kids leaving him. He is rescued from all of this by Krishna Vasudev Yadav, who claims to be a real estate agent originally from Gokul, Uttar Pradesh, but appears to do fantastical acts not possible for a human.

The lawsuit causes a public outcry. On Krishna's advice, Kanji goes to the media and gets wide coverage. Many people in a  situation like Kanji join him in the lawsuit, causing the amount of claims to skyrocket and Catholic fathers and Muslim Mullahs to also be forced as defendants. When the court demands written proof that the earthquake was an 'Act of God,' Krishna steers Kanji toward holy books like Bhagavad Gita, The Quran and The Bible. Kanji reads them and finds a passage in each that says the world and all that happen in it, from beginning to end, is a creation of God and comes from God's will alone. This strengthens his case and increases public support. However, Kanji suffers a stroke in court and is rushed to the hospital where he goes into a coma and is paralyzed. When he opens his eyes after a month, he finds Krishna, who reveals that he is God, and proves it by curing Kanji completely. He further reveals that He created the entire world, animals and humans but religion was created by humans, and he was the one who destroyed Kanji's shop because he sought to punish the godmen who showed his fear to the public, to earn money. He adds that he created the entire world and thus doesn't like to live in temples contrary to what the godmen claims and he is not interested in the offerings he gets from devotees. Instead, he created millions of humans who die of hunger and would be glad if those offerings were given to them instead. He figured out that an atheist like Kanji would end up exposing them if he destroys his Shop, and thus destroyed it by causing the disaster and started to help him with lawsuit by appearing as a human and befriending him and revealed himself in his true form so that Kanji realises that although he does exist, he doesn't live in temples, but in every creature he created.

Kanji learns that the lawsuit's verdict was in his favour, and religious organizations were ordered by the court to pay the compensation to all the plaintiffs. As a result of this, people have begun revering Kanji himself as a god. Leeladhar, Gopi Maiyya, and Siddheshwar have taken advantage of this by opening a temple dedicated to Kanji, and accumulating millions in donations. Krishna explains to Kanji that his job as God is to show people right and wrong – people do with it what they will. Kanji decides to fight back. He breaks his own statue, admonishing the crowd about trusting in God-men. He advises them to search for God in themselves and in others, not in statues; that God is everywhere, not just in temples, and faith should come from within. He tells them not to believe in fraudulent godmen, as their job is to turn religion into business.

Krishna looks on proudly as Kanji speaks, then vanishes when Kanji tries to reach him after. Kanji is reunited with his family and sees Krishna's key chain on the ground. When he is about to keep it, he hears Krishna's voice, telling him to get rid of the key chain as fear of God and reliance on religious objects was what he'd fought against all this time. Kanji smiles and throws it away, watching as it disappears in the sky with a flash.

Cast

Mithun Chakraborty as Leeladhar Swamy
Akshay Kumar as Krishna Vasudev Yadav
Paresh Rawal as Kanji Lalji Mehta
Om Puri as Advocate Hanif Qureshi
Mahesh Manjrekar as Advocate Sardesai
Govind Namdeo as Siddheshwar Maharaj
Murli Sharma as Laxman Mishra
Nikhil Ratnaparkhi as Mahadev
Lubna Salim as Susheela Mehta (Kanji's wife)
Poonam Jhawer as Gopi Maiyya
Yousuf Hussain Khan as Judge
Jaineeraj Rajpurohit as Dinesh Gandhi
Nidhi Subbaiah as Shweta Tiwari (news reporter)
Apoorva Arora as Jigna Mehta (Kanji's daughter)
Azaan Rustam Shah as Chintu Mehta (Kanji's son)
Honey Chhaya as Jagdeesh
Krunal Pandit as Praveen
Bhakti Ratnaparkhi as Mangala (Mahadev's wife)
Arun Bali as Accha Sadhu
Pradeep Vengurlekar as Pujari
Kukul Taramaster as Mishra's right hand man
Nilesh Pandya as the Bhajan singer
Pravin Naik as Besaniya
Puja Gupta as Hanif's daughter
Suneel Chauhan as Aslam
Shashi Omprakash Sati as Aslam's sister
Manju Vyas as Sardesai's assistant
Tisca Chopra as The interview host
Prabhu Deva in a special appearance in the song "Go Go Go Govinda"
Sonakshi Sinha in a special appearance in the song "Go Go Go Govinda"

Production

Producer Akshay Kumar announced the film in 2012. Paresh Rawal who appeared in the original play Kishen vs Kanhaiya was cast in the lead role with Akshay Kumar playing the role of Krishna in the movie. Mithun Chakraborty played a supporting role in the film. The filming was reported to have begun in January 2012. Director Prabhu Deva appeared in an item number along with Sonakshi Sinha.

Soundtrack

The soundtrack of OMG – Oh My God! was composed by Himesh Reshammiya, Sachin–Jigar and Meet Bros Anjjan whilst the lyrics were penned by Shabbir Ahmed, Kumaar, Swanand Kirkire and Subrat Sinha. The album features vocals by Reshammiya, Shreya Ghoshal, Kailash Kher, Benny Dayal, Ash King, Suraj Jagan, Keerthi Sagathia, Zubeen Garg, Meet Bros Anjjan, Arya Acharya, Mohammed Irfan, Aman Trikha and Parash Nath. The full audio album was launched on 12 September 2012 by T-Series.

Release
OMG – Oh My God! released worldwide on 28 September 2012.

Critical reception

The film was critically well received.

Taran Adarsh of Bollywood Hungama gave the film 3.5 out of 5 stars and wrote that OMG – OH MY GOD! was a "thought-provoking adaptation of a massively successful play. A movie tackling a sensitive and an untouched subject matter, it will find its share of advocates and adversaries, but the social message the movie conveys comes across loud and clear and that's one of the prime reasons why OMG becomes a deserving watch". Sukanya Verma of Rediff rated it 4 out of 5 reviewing "A brave and absorbing blend of satire, fable and fantasy that brings our attention to the misuse and commercialisation of religion". Faisal Saif of Independent Bollywood rated it 4 out of 5 and said "Strongly Recommended. Fearless concept with some Fearless performances".

Box office 

The film had a low opening but showed good growth on its 2nd and 3rd day and collected  nett in its opening weekend. Despite a slow start, the film managed to gross collections of  nett in its first week. The film collected  in its second week. Overseas, OMG – Oh My God! grossed US$2.5 million in 10 days. At the end of 17 days, OMG – Oh My God! had grossed .

Awards
The movie was awarded the Best Hindi film award by Institute for Research and Documentation in Social Sciences (IRDS) during the second IRDS Hindi Film Awards for social concern. The film has won the award for Best Adapted Screenplay in 60th National Film Awards.

See also
Bhagavad Gita trial in Russia
Gopala Gopala (2015 film)
Religious satire

References

External links

2012 films
2010s Hindi-language films
Indian satirical films
Films set in Mumbai
Films about lawsuits against God
Indian courtroom films
2010s fantasy comedy-drama films
Hindi films remade in other languages
Hinduism in pop culture-related controversies
Indian fantasy comedy-drama films
Indian religious comedy films
Indian films based on plays
Films scored by Amar Mohile
Films whose writer won the Best Adapted Screenplay National Film Award
Viacom18 Studios films
Films directed by Umesh Shukla
Films with atheism-related themes
Films about Krishna
Hinduism in popular culture
Films about superstition